Elections to Watford Borough Council were held on 2 May 2002. One third of the council was up for election and the  council stayed under no overall control. At the same time an election for a directly elected mayor was held, which was won by the Liberal Democrat Dorothy Thornhill.

After the election, the composition of the council was:
Labour 15
Liberal Democrat 13
Conservative 7
Independent 1

Mayoral election

Council election result

Ward results

References

Mayor election results
2002 Watford election result
 Ward results

2002
2002 English local elections
2000s in Hertfordshire